Acrocercops zygonoma, also known as a leafminer, is a moth of the family Gracillariidae, discovered in 1921 by Edward Meyrick. It is known from India (Bihar).

The larvae feed on Mangifera indica and Gossypium species. They probably mine the leaves of their host plant.

The species has been officially labelled a pest and prohibited from Western Australia.

References

zygonoma
Moths described in 1921
Moths of Asia